Sandy Warren is a  biological Site of Special Scientific Interest in Sandy in Bedfordshire. It is part of The Lodge, a nature reserve run by the Royal Society for the Protection of Birds (RSPB), and named after the RSPB headquarters called The Lodge at the same site.

The site is heathland on the acidic soil of the Lower Greensand ridge, which is now comparatively rare. It also has areas of unimproved grassland and birch woodland. Dragonflies breed in artificial pools, and the site is also noted for many fungi and bird species. Additional habitats are damp areas and seasonal pools, which have some uncommon species such as distant sedge and carnation sedge. The RSPB is felling conifers to create additional areas of heath.

There is a network of footpaths from the RSPB headquarters off Potton Road.

References

Royal Society for the Protection of Birds reserves in England
Sites of Special Scientific Interest in Bedfordshire